UNITAS are sea exercises and in-port training involving several countries in North, South and Central America, conducted by the United States since 1959 in support of U.S. policy.

In 2009, the exercises were named UNITAS Gold, in recognition of the fiftieth anniversary of the first exercises in 1959.

See also 
 Foreign policy of the United States
 Military of the United States

External links

 UNITAS at US Navy website 
 UNITAS –GlobalSecurity.org

Foreign relations of the United States
Military exercises and wargames
Military exercises involving the United States
Military operations involving Canada
United States Navy in the 20th century
United States Navy in the 21st century
Recurring events established in 1959